Bani is a village and a tehsil in the Kathua district of Jammu and Kashmir, India.

Banking Facilities
 SBI, Bani

Jammu and Kashmir bank limited Bani.

Punjab National Bank Bani.

J&K cooperative Bank Bani.

J&K Garman  Bank Duggan.

References

Villages in Bani tehsil